Girona Station may refer to:

 Girona railway station, a station in Girona, Spain
 Girona (Barcelona Metro), a station in Barcelona, Spain